Nahal (acronym of Noar Halutzi Lohem, lit. Fighting Pioneer Youth) is a program that combines military service with mostly social welfare and informal education projects such as youth movement activities, as well as training in entrepreneurship in urban development areas. Prior to the 1990s it was a paramilitary Israel Defense Forces program that combined military service and the establishment of agricultural settlements, often in peripheral areas.

The Nahal groups of soldiers formed the core of the Nahal Infantry Brigade.

History
In 1948, a gar'in (core group) of Jewish pioneers wrote to Prime Minister David Ben-Gurion requesting that members be allowed to do their military service as a group rather than being split up into different units at random. In response to this letter, Ben-Gurion created the Nahal program, which combined military service and farming.

Some 108 kibbutzim and agricultural settlements were established by the Nahal, many of them on Israel's borders. Nahal settlements in the Jordan Valley and the Arabah played an important role in Jordan's decision not to join the other Arab countries in attacking Israel during the Yom Kippur War.

Members of Nahal units, known as garinei Nahal (Nahal seeds) have served together in various army units, most famously in the Nahal Mutznakh (Airborne Nahal) battalion of the Paratroopers Brigade, the reserve battalion of which was instrumental in the Israeli victory in the Battle of Jerusalem during the 1967 Six-Day War. Many settlements founded by Nahal units in Galilee, the Negev, and the West Bank are still thriving today, including settlements formerly located in the Sinai Peninsula and Gaza Strip. Today, a gar'in is usually a group formed by a youth movement, such as the Israeli Scouts, for the purpose of volunteer work.

Nahal and Youth Command 
Today, there are two distinct units carrying on the historical tradition and name of the Nahal. The first is a large, non-combat command belonging to the IDF Education Corps, whose primary responsibility is to organize and coordinate the volunteer-type programs and activities that made the original Nahal unit famous in the 1950s, 1960s, and 1970s. This command has a full staff of educational officers and soldiers, and also sponsors other endeavours such as Gadna, a week-long 'introduction' to the military for high-schoolers in which they become acquainted with the history, traditions, and routines of the military that they are about to join.

Nahal group
The Nahal group (Hebrew: גרעין נחל) is a form of community service developed in Israel, which combines social volunteerism, agriculture and military service. The service is divided into several parts:
 The military period (פרק צבאי)
 The national mission period (פרק משימה)
 Routine security measures (only for the male members) (בט"ש)
 Unpaid military service period (Military service with no payment) (של"ת)

The order of the periods is permanent, but there are changes in the length of the periods, in accordance with the recruitment cycles. Also, it is possible to have the unpaid military service period either at the beginning or at the end of each course.

The military period
During the first military period, the members of the Nahal group serve in the Nahal infantry brigade together. The male members have a combat service as part of the 50th battalion or Caracal Battalion, and the female members serve in the Caracal Battalion or in different positions in the Education and Youth Corps and the Nahal headquarters. As part of their service, the members of the same group are entitled to serve in the same military unit (the 50th battalion, in the Caracal Battalion and in basic training of the female soldiers and the non-combat soldiers), and to hold a group meeting once in a while. At the end of their military service, after the release of the female Nahal soldiers, the remaining Nahal members return for half a year of routine security measures activities.

The national mission period
The national mission period lasts a year, in which all the core group stays together, under the command of the Education and Youth Corps. During the establishment of the state, the national mission was mostly the establishment of new settlements in periphery areas (by means of Nahal settlements) and expansion of the existing kibbutzim. Over the years, and in accordance with the changes in the Israeli society, the national mission has changed to helping the poor populations throughout the country and nowadays the Nahal groups perform in the National mission period social and educational-based missions in the social periphery of the state of Israel. The soldiers live in apartments in different local authorities, and work in different education tasks in the schools, in the community centers, in the youth clubs, in the absorption centers, etc. The group is accompanied by Military commanders, the Youth organizers in the local authorities and representatives of the youth movement to which the group belongs to core.

The unpaid military-service periods are a remainder of the Nahal course which included living in kibbutzim, but today are more similar to the national mission periods, yet are shorter and are less monitored by the army.

In general, the military service of male members of the Nahal group is four months longer than the military service of most soldiers. However, some of the Nahal groups continue to work together, anyway, even after the military service, as part of adult movements or choose to continue living together, regardless of their original movement.

The Orthodox Nahal
Under the Nahal framework, there is now also a route in which soldiers who originate from the Jewish ultra-Orthodox sector could join. They serve for two years in the 97th battalion of the Kfir Brigade, and in addition they go to a one-year school in order to complete their studies and get a matriculation certificate or in order to get a profession.

Israel's first Prime Minister, David Ben-Gurion, established the Nahal program in 1949.

The Nahal Band
Lahakat HaNahal (The Nahal Band or the Nahal Entertainment Troupe) is a military music troupe known for its Eretz Israel songs. Founded in 1950, it has become an integral part in Israeli military culture. It was the second major band to be founded in the State of Israel after the Israel Defense Forces Orchestra. In the early 1960s, there were many changes in the band, especially in the musical production. The accordion was joined by percussion, as well as brass and wind instruments. In April 1978, some songs by the band; as well as some people that were once in the band; were featured on The Band, a comedic musical film about the band in 1968 during the War of Attrition. The band has also been featured on the Israeli telenovela HaShir Shelanu. The band has made multiple albums, including From Nahal With Love (1966), The Nahal Is Coming (1967) and The Twenty One Program (1969). Many Israeli singers and entertainers began their careers in Lahakat HaNahal, among them Tuvia Tzafir, Neomy Polani and Gidi Gov.

Other notable members include:
Arik Einstein, Israeli rock songwriter
Danny Sanderson, American-Israeli musician
Shalom Hanoch, a lyricist and composer considered to be the father of Israeli rock
Yossi Banai, one of the original members of the band

Most of the members of the band Kaveret were formerly members of the Nahal Band.

Nahal infantry brigade

The Nahal Brigade was formed around core groups of Airborne Nahal soldiers in 1982 due to the growing need for infantry manpower in the wake of the 1982 Lebanon War. As a result, it maintains parts of the Nahal insignia and Nahal groups continue to serve there.

Weapons and Gear
The Nahal brigade uses the IMI Tavor TAR-21 rifle.

Awards and recognition
In 1984, Nahal was awarded the Israel Prize for its special contribution to society and the State of Israel.

See also 
Nahal group
Nahal settlement
List of Israel Prize recipients

References

External links
Official IDF website section on Nahal Brigade
Official Haredi Nahal  Website
Official Nahal Website (Hebrew Only)

Military units and formations of Israel
Israel Prize for special contribution to society and the State recipients
Israel Prize recipients that are organizations
Military units and formations established in 1948
1948 establishments in Israel